State Route 275 is a state highway located entirely within central San Juan County, Utah, United States, on the northwestern limits of Cedar Mesa. The highway provides access to the Bears Ears and Natural Bridges National Monument.

Route description
The route forms part of the Trail of the Ancients National Scenic Byway.

History
SR-275 was designated by the state legislature in 1975 along a road that had been built in the 1960s.

Major intersections

See also

 List of state highways in Utah

References

External links

275
275
 275